Devang or also spelled as Debang is an Indian given name, which means "one who is part or fragment of God or supreme deity". Notable people with the name include:

Devang Gandhi (born 1971), Indian cricketer
Devang Patel (born 1970), Indian singer, actor, and dancer
Devang Vipin Khakhar (born 1959), Indian chemical engineer

Indian masculine given names